Hugh Goldie (10 February 1874 – 1 September 1935) was a Scottish footballer active at the turn of the 20th century.  He played in England for Everton, making a total of 18 appearances in The Football League. In his native Scotland his clubs included Celtic, St Mirren and Dundee.

Career
Goldie was born in Dalry, Ayrshire, where his father was a miner. He later moved to the Riccarton area of Kilmarnock where he played football for Hurlford Thistle, when he was not working as a bonded storeman. In 1895 he was playing for St Mirren and had been selected for the Scottish League XI when he was spotted by Everton, spending two seasons on Merseyside. He subsequently transferred to Celtic where he spent 18 months, winning the Scottish Football League title in 1897–98 but falling out of favour in the next campaign after two heavy losses to Rangers (1–4 and 0–4) confirmed they would be unable to repeat the achievement. 

He then had spells at Dundee, Barry Town, Millwall and New Brompton.

During his married life he had four sons and four daughters. His sons Hugh and John both became professional footballers. He died in September 1935 in Kilmarnock. Although from the same district, his family is not closely related to the Goldie brothers (Archie and Bill) who played for Liverpool in the same era.

References

1874 births
1935 deaths
Scottish footballers
Footballers from East Ayrshire
English Football League players
Everton F.C. players
Celtic F.C. players
Dundee F.C. players
St Mirren F.C. players
Millwall F.C. players
Gillingham F.C. players
Barry Town United F.C. players
Scottish Junior Football Association players
Scottish Football League  players
Southern Football League  players
Scottish Football League representative players
Association football wing halves